Matilde Leonardi is an Italian neurologist and paediatrician. At present she is Director of Neurology in the Public Health, Disability Unit and Coma Research Centre at the Carlo Besta Neurological Institute in Milan.She is a FEAN, (Fellow of the European Academy of Neurology) and a WHO expert and consultant on neurology, disability, ageing and policy development who is co-chair of the WHO NeuroCOVID Forum group on essential neurological services for COVID-19 recoverers. Leonardi is also a  World Federation of Neurorehabilitation (WFNR) Presidium Member.

Early training
Matilde Leonardi was born in Pesaro in the Italian region of Marche. She qualified as a doctor of medicine, specialising in neurology and in pediatrics, with further studies on neonatology, pediatric neurology and bioethics.

Career

Leonardi teaches at the Università Cattolica del Sacro Cuore in Milan, where she became an associate professor of neurology in 2014 and a full professor of rehabilitation in 2015. She teaches neuropsychiatric aspects of disability for a special master's degree. Since 2007 she has been on the Board of Directors of the Bioethics Centre at that university.

Leonardi works as a researcher and team leader at the Carlo Besta Neurological Institute (INNCB). At that Institute, she develops and carries out research projects related to neurology, chronic diseases and employment, disability, ageing, public health, neurorehabilitation and the burdens of neurological disorders. Her team has one of the largest epidemiological databases on these types of illnesses worldwide. She is co-chair of the World Health Organization (WHO)-FIC (Family of International Classifications) Functioning and Disability Reference Group (FDRG) and Director of the Italian WHO Collaborating Centre Research Branch. She also coordinates several European projects, including COURAGE (Collaborative research on Ageing) and Mhadie (Measuring Health and Disability in Europe).

Since 1995, Leonardi has been working with the WHO on International Classification of Functioning, Disability and Health (ICF) and has been co-chair of the WHO ICF children's group. Since 2001 she has been coordinator of several research projects funded by the EU and others. From March 2020, she has been leading NEUROCOVID research at the institute. Leonardi also consults on public health, and on Convention on the Rights of Persons with Disabilities (UNCRPD) monitoring and disability policy development, having worked with several national governments. She has been an expert for the European Commission on public health, ageing, disability and neurosciences. She was one of the founders of the European Brain Council in 2002 and is responsible for that council's liaison with the WHO. From 2010 to 2013 she was president of the Italian Scientific Committee on disability, monitoring its UNCRPD implementation. She has been vice-president of the Italian Federation Neurological Associations. In November 2011, she was appointed by the Vatican as a corresponding member of the Pontifical Academy for Life or Pontificia Accademia Pro Vita. In September 2020, she was nominated as Fellow of the European Academy of Neurology.

Honours and awards
In December 2019 Leonardi was appointed "Italian Excellence for Research", upon nomination of the Ministry of Health, as one of the 100 "Italian Excellences, 2019".

References

External links
Matilde Leonardi gives a TEDx talk (in Italian)

Year of birth missing (living people)
Living people
Italian neurologists
Italian pediatricians
People from Pesaro
Academic staff of the Università Cattolica del Sacro Cuore